Marković is a common family name in Bosnia and Herzegovina, Croatia, Montenegro, Austria and Serbia. It is a patronym of Marko, the local variant of the common European name "Marcus" or "Mark".

Marković is the fourth most frequent surname in Serbia, and the tenth most frequent surname in Croatia.

Notable people with the surname include:

Aleksandar Marković (conductor) (born 1975), Serbian conductor
Ante Marković (1924–2011), Croatian politician, Prime Minister of SFR Yugoslavia 1989–1991
Antun Marković (born 1992), Croatian footballer
Boban Marković, Serbian Roma trumpet player and leader of a brass music ensemble
Brigitte Markovic, Australian judge
Dragan "Palma" Marković (born 1960), Serbian politician, president of the United Serbia political party
Duško Marković (born 1958), Montenegrin politician, Prime Minister of Montenegro 2016-2020
Filip Marković (born 1992), Serbian footballer, brother of Lazar
Franjo Marković (1845–1914), Croatian philosopher and writer
Goran Marković (born 1946), Serbian film director
Gordana Marković (born 1951), Serbian chess master
Ivana Dulić-Marković (born 1961), Serbian Minister of Agriculture, Forestry, and Water Management 2004–2006
Lazar Marković (born 1994), Serbian footballer, brother of Filip
Marjan Marković (born 1981), Serbian footballer
Mihailo Marković (1923–2010), Serbian philosopher
Milovan Destil Marković (born 1957) Serbian contemporary artist
Mirjana Marković (1942–2019), Serbian politician, widow of Slobodan Milošević
Nina Marković, Croatian physicist and professor
Olivera Marković (1925–2011), Serbian actress
 Pavo Marković, Croatian water polo player
Predrag Marković (born 1955), Serbian politician, acting president of Serbia for few months in 2004
Radomir Marković (born 1948), Serbian security operative, former head of the State Security Service (RDB)
Stefan Marković (born 1988), Serbian basketball player
Stevan Marković (1937–1968),  bodyguard of Alain Delon and murder victim
Steven Marković (born 1985), Australian basketball player
Svetozar Marković (1846–1875), 19th century Serbian socialist politician
Vlatko Marković (1937–2013) president of the Croatian Football Federation 1999–2012
Zvonko Marković, Serbian fashion designer

References

See also 
 Markovics
 Markov
 Marcovici

Croatian surnames
Serbian surnames
Patronymic surnames
Surnames from given names